The Italian general election of 1996 took place on 21 April 1996.

The election was won in Sardinia by the centre-left The Olive Tree (which included the Sardinian Action Party), which won also nationally.

Results

Chamber of Deputies

|- bgcolor="#E9E9E9"
!style="background-color:#E9E9E9" align=left rowspan=2 valign=bottom|Coalitions
!colspan="3" align="center" valign=top|Single-seat constituencies
!colspan="5" align="center" valign=top|Proportional system
!colspan="1" align="center" valign=top|Total
|-
|- bgcolor="#E9E9E9"
|align="center" valign=top|votes
|align="center" valign=top|votes (%)
|align="center" valign=top|seats
|align="center" valign=top|Parties
|align="center" valign=top|votes
|align="center" valign=top|votes (%)
|align="center" valign=top|seats
|align="center" valign=top|tot.
|align="center" valign=top|seats

|-
|rowspan="6" align="left" valign=top|The Olive Tree–Progressives–PSd'Az
|rowspan="6" align="right" valign=top|482,169
|rowspan="6" align="right" valign=top|48.8
|rowspan="6" align="right" valign=top|8

|rowspan="1" align="left"|Democratic Party of the Left
|align="right"|202,142
|align="right"|20.3
|align="right"|1

|rowspan="6" align="right" valign=top|2
|rowspan="6" align="right" valign=top|10

|-

|rowspan="1" align="left"|Communist Refoundation Party
|align="right"|83,813
|align="right"|8.4
|align="right"|1

|-

|rowspan="1" align="left"|Italian Renewal-Socialists-Patto
|align="right"|69,969
|align="right"|7.0
|align="right"|-

|-

|rowspan="1" align="left"|Italian People's Party-UD-PRI-SVP-Prodi
|align="right"|60,974
|align="right"|6.1
|align="right"|-

|-

|rowspan="1" align="left"|Federation of the Greens
|align="right"|20,713
|align="right"|2.1
|align="right"|-

|-

|rowspan="1" align="left"|Sardinian Action Party
|align="right"|38,002
|align="right"|3.8
|align="right"|-

|-
|rowspan="4" align="left" valign=top|Pole of Freedoms
|rowspan="4" align="right" valign=top|456,253
|rowspan="4" align="right" valign=top|46.1
|rowspan="4" align="right" valign=top|6

|rowspan="1" align="left"|Forza Italia
|align="right"|227,596
|align="right"|22.9
|align="right"|1

|rowspan="4" align="right" valign=top|2
|rowspan="4" align="right" valign=top|8

|-

|rowspan="1" align="left"|National Alliance
|align="right"|182,648
|align="right"|18.3
|align="right"|1

|-

|rowspan="1" align="left"|CCD-CDU
|align="right"|60,205
|align="right"|6.0
|align="right"|-

|-

|rowspan="1" align="left"|Pannella-Sgarbi List
|align="right"|20,537
|align="right"|2.1
|align="right"|-

|-
|rowspan="1" align="left"|Sardinia Nation
|rowspan="1" align="right"|42,246
|rowspan="1" align="right"|4.3
|rowspan="1" align="right"|-

|rowspan="1" align="left"|Sardinia Nation
|align="right"|23,355
|align="right"|2.3
|align="right"|-

|rowspan="1" align="right"|-
|rowspan="1" align="right"|-

|-
|rowspan="1" align="left"|Others
|rowspan="1" align="right"|8,332
|rowspan="1" align="right"|0.8
|rowspan="1" align="right"|-

|rowspan="1" align="left"|others
|align="right"|6,270
|align="right"|0.6
|align="right"|-

|rowspan="1" align="right"|-
|rowspan="1" align="right"|-

|-
|- bgcolor="#E9E9E9"
!rowspan="1" align="left" valign="top"|Total coalitions
!rowspan="1" align="right" valign="top"|989,000
!rowspan="1" align="right" valign="top"|100.0
!rowspan="1" align="right" valign="top"|14
!rowspan="1" align="left" valign="top"|Total parties
!rowspan="1" align="right" valign="top"|996,224
!rowspan="1" align="right" valign="top"|100.0
!rowspan="1" align="right" valign="top"|4
!rowspan="1" align="right" valign="top"|4
!rowspan="1" align="right" valign="top"|18
|}
Source: Ministry of the Interior

Senate

|- bgcolor="#E9E9E9"
!style="background-color:#E9E9E9" align=left rowspan=2 valign=bottom|Coalitions
!colspan="3" align="center" valign=top|Single-seat constituencies
!colspan="1" align="center" valign=top|Prop.
!colspan="1" align="center" valign=top|Total
|-
|- bgcolor="#E9E9E9"
|align="center" valign=top|votes
|align="center" valign=top|votes (%)
|align="center" valign=top|seats
|align="center" valign=top|seats
|align="center" valign=top|seats
|-
|rowspan="1" align="left"|The Olive Tree–PSd'Az
|rowspan="1" align="right" valign=top|421,331
|rowspan="1" align="right" valign=top|50.0
|rowspan="1" align="right" valign=top|5
|rowspan="1" align="right" valign=top|-
|rowspan="1" align="right" valign=top|5
|-
|rowspan="1" align="left" valign=top|Pole for Freedoms
|rowspan="1" align="right" valign=top|376,042
|rowspan="1" align="right" valign=top|44.7
|rowspan="1" align="right" valign=top|1
|rowspan="1" align="right" valign=top|3
|rowspan="1" align="right" valign=top|4
|-
|rowspan="1" align="left"|Sardinia Nation
|rowspan="1" align="right" valign=top|44,713
|rowspan="1" align="right" valign=top|5.3
|rowspan="1" align="right" valign=top|-
|rowspan="1" align="right" valign=top|-
|rowspan="1" align="right" valign=top|-
|-
|- bgcolor="#E9E9E9"
!rowspan="1" align="left" valign="top"|Total coalitions
!rowspan="1" align="right" valign="top"|842,086
!rowspan="1" align="right" valign="top"|100.0
!rowspan="1" align="right" valign="top"|6
!rowspan="1" align="right" valign="top"|3
!rowspan="1" align="right" valign="top"|9
|}
 Source: Ministry of the Interior

Elections in Sardinia
1996 elections in Italy
April 1996 events in Europe